The Gothic Protestant Church of Avas is the oldest building in the centre of the city of Miskolc in Northern Hungary. It was built in the 13th century as a small, Romanesque style church, and later it was expanded to a larger Gothic style church. In 1544, during the Ottoman occupation of Hungary the Turks set the church on fire. Because it was already a Protestant church, the Catholic owner of the Diósgyőr estate, Borbála Fánchy, didn't give her permission to use the wood from the nearby forests to rebuild the church, and it was rebuilt only more than twenty years later.

The organ of the church was built by József Angster in 1895. The acoustics of the church is very good, and concerts are held quite often.

The belfry was built in 1557. The bells have played a version of the Westminster Chimes every 15 minutes since 1941. Because of the noisy traffic, the chimes cannot be heard from too far away, however it is one of the best known sounds of the city. The National Theatre of Miskolc signals the beginning of a play with this sound.

The church is surrounded by a cemetery, where many famous sons of the city were buried, including the politicians Bertalan Szemere and László Palóczy, members of the Latabár actor dynasty, and the father of the poet Mihály Tompa.

External links

 The church and the belfry
 Pictures of the inside of the church on the website of Ottó Herman Museum
 The church on an old postcard (cca. 1910)
 A picture of the church from 1990
 Inside of the church
 Aerial photographs of the church
 About the church on HelloMiskolc.hu 

13th-century churches in Hungary
Churches in Miskolc
Gothic architecture in Hungary